Gabapentin enacarbil (Horizant, Regnite (in Japan)) is an anticonvulsant and analgesic drug of the gabapentinoid class, and a prodrug to gabapentin. It was designed for increased oral bioavailability over gabapentin, and human trials showed it to produce extended release of gabapentin with almost twice the overall bioavailability, especially when taken with a fatty meal. Gabapentin enacarbil has passed human clinical trials for the treatment of restless legs syndrome, and initial results have shown it to be well tolerated and reasonably effective.

Gabapentin enacarbil was denied approval by the U.S. Food and Drug Administration (FDA) in February 2010, citing concerns about possible increased cancer risk shown by some animal studies. Similar concerns had been raised about gabapentin itself in the past, but were felt to be outweighed by its clinical utility as an anticonvulsant, whereas the treatment of restless legs syndrome was not seen to justify the same kind of risk. On April 6, 2011, Xenoport received FDA approval for Horizant (gabapentin enacarbil) for the treatment of moderate-to-severe restless legs syndrome. On June 7, 2012, the FDA approved Horizant for the treatment of postherpetic neuralgia in adults.

References

External links 
 

Amino acids
Anticonvulsants
Analgesics
Calcium channel blockers
GABA analogues
Prodrugs
GSK plc brands